Khulay Asmaan Kay Neechay is a 2008 Pakistani movie directed by Javed Sheikh starring Sana and Saleem Sheikh along with Humayun Saeed, Nadeem Baig, Behroze Sabzwari and Javed Sheikh.

Humayun Saeed disclosed in a TV interview that this film is based on a love story between a Pakistani guy (played by Saleem Sheikh) and an Indian girl (played by Meera). The filming locations are unique, talking in an interview Javed Sheikh said it's exclusively shot in four countries: Australia, UAE, India and Pakistan. Sheikh said about his film, "They (Pakistanis) will all be proud of my film and will own up to it as a Pakistani product as it is a perfect family film.

Synopsis 
The story revolves around a young man who marries a young woman of his choice against the wishes of his family. His father had dotingly wanted him to marry the daughter of his family member and she, in innocence, has lived this dream.

But the path of true love is seldom smooth. Emotional turmoil, family drama and poignant scenes, true love triumphs over all because matches are made in heaven.

Songs
 Allah Allah Dulhan Hamari -
 Dhoop Bahri -
 Dil Day Tau Allah Judai Na Dey -
 Her Dil Mein Dil Bar -
 Ladki Mumbai Ki -
 Teri Arzoo -
 Khulay Aasman Kay Neechay -

Cast 
 Saleem Sheikh
 Sana
 Humayun Saeed
 Nadeem
 Behroze Sabzwari
 Javed Sheikh
 Meera
 Badar Khalil 
 Ismail Tara  
 Usama Qaisar (played child actor role of Saleem Sheikh)
 Rabika Qaisar (played child actor role of Sana)
 Shehroz Sabzwari

References

External links 
Khulay Aasman Ke Neechay (2008 film) on IMDb website

2008 films
2000s Urdu-language films
Pakistani romance films
2000s romance films